Sydney Young Wright (15 September 1882 – 23 April 1952) was an Australian rules footballer who played with South Melbourne in the Victorian Football League (VFL).

Notes

External links 

1882 births
1952 deaths
Australian rules footballers from Sydney
Sydney Swans players
Albury Football Club players